Whitewater Creek is a stream in the U.S. state of South Dakota.

The name stems from the water's white-gray color, a function of sediment carried by the river from its source near the Badlands.

See also
List of rivers of South Dakota

References

Rivers of Jackson County, South Dakota
Rivers of Pennington County, South Dakota
Rivers of South Dakota